The name Reimerswaal can mean:

Reimerswaal (city) A lost city in the Netherlands
Verdronken Land van Reimerswaal The now-drowned land around the city
Battle of Reimerswaal on 29 January 1574 during the Eighty Years' War
Reimerswaal (municipality) A municipality in Zealand, Netherlands, named after the lost city

br:Reimerswaal
ca:Reimerswaal
de:Reimerswaal
eu:Reimerswaal
fy:Reimerswiel
gl:Reimerswaal
id:Reimerswaal
it:Reimerswaal
li:Reimerswaal
ms:Reimerswaal
no:Reimerswaal
ro:Reimerswaal
sv:Reimerswaal
vi:Reimerswaal
vo:Reimerswaal
war:Reimerswaal